Kayla Canett (born April 29, 1998) is an American rugby union player. She made her debut for both the United States fifteens and sevens team in 2017. She was named in the Eagles 2017 Women's Rugby World Cup squad.

Biography 
Canett attended Fallbrook High School and Pennsylvania State University.

Canett made her sevens debut at the 2016 Dubai Women's Sevens and her fifteen's debut against Canada. She began her rugby career in her freshman year of high school in 2013. She previously played basketball and soccer. She is majoring in Kinesiology at Penn State.

Canett competed at the 2019 Pan American Games. She was also selected for the U.S. Eagles sevens squad for the 2020 Summer Olympics. In 2022, She was again selected in the United States team for the Rugby World Cup Sevens in Cape Town.

See also

 List of Pennsylvania State University Olympians

References

External links
 Kayla Canett at USA Rugby
 
Kayla Canett-Oca of The  States carries the ball during rugby... News Photo - Getty Images

1998 births
Living people
American female rugby union players
United States women's international rugby union players
American female rugby sevens players
Pan American Games medalists in rugby sevens
Pan American Games silver medalists for the United States
Rugby sevens players at the 2019 Pan American Games
Medalists at the 2019 Pan American Games
Rugby sevens players at the 2020 Summer Olympics
Olympic rugby sevens players of the United States
21st-century American women